Ocotea cymbarum is a species of Ocotea in the plant family Lauraceae. It is an evergreen tree found in Brazil, Colombia, French Guiana, Guyana, Suriname, and Venezuela.

Medical uses
The essential oils from Ocotea cymbarum are often used in the synthesis of MDMA (contracted form of 3,4-methylenedioxy-methamphetamine); a psychoactive drug of the substituted methylenedioxyphenethylamine and substituted amphetamine classes of drugs that is consumed primarily for its euphoric and empathogenic effects. Pharmacologically, MDMA acts as a serotonin-norepinephrine-dopamine releasing agent and reuptake inhibitor.

References

cymbarum
Flora of northern South America
Flora of Brazil
Flora of the Amazon
Trees of South America
Least concern plants
Least concern biota of South America
Taxonomy articles created by Polbot